Chow Tsun Man (born 10 June 1931) is a Hong Kong sports shooter. He competed at the 1976 Summer Olympics and the 1984 Summer Olympics.

References

External links
 

1931 births
Possibly living people
Hong Kong male sport shooters
Olympic shooters of Hong Kong
Shooters at the 1976 Summer Olympics
Shooters at the 1984 Summer Olympics
Place of birth missing (living people)